Diana Gansky ( Sachse; born 14 December 1963 in Bergen auf Rügen, Bezirk Rostock) is a German track and field athlete. She won an Olympic medal and was one of the world's best discus throwers.  She represented East Germany and was the 1986 European champion (with her birth name Sachse). In 1987 and 1988 she was second in both the world championship and the Olympic games.

Gansky won the European Junior Championship as a 17-year-old in 1981, but she needed a few more years before she was able to compete with the already strong discus team of East Germany. She stood in the shadows of Martina Hellmann (who she only beat at the 1986 European championship).  For a long time she trained with Gabriele Reinsch, the world record holder since July 1988 when she threw 76.80 meters. During her career Gansky reached 70 meters in 24 meetings, more than any other woman.

She represented ASK Vorwärts Potsdam and trained with Lothar Hillebrand. During her active career she was 1.84 meters tall and weighed 92 kilograms.  She studied sports science, and at the time of German reunification she became a self-employed physiotherapist. Later she became active on the senior sports circuit and became the 2002 European Masters Champion (age 35–40). Gansky set her personal best (74.08 metres) on 20 June 1987 in Karl-Marx-Stadt; an East German record until 9 July 1988.

International competitions
All results regarding Discus

References

1963 births
Living people
People from Bergen auf Rügen
People from Bezirk Rostock
East German female discus throwers
Sportspeople from Mecklenburg-Western Pomerania
Olympic athletes of East Germany
Athletes (track and field) at the 1988 Summer Olympics
World Athletics Championships athletes for East Germany
World Athletics Championships medalists
European Athletics Championships medalists
Medalists at the 1988 Summer Olympics
Olympic silver medalists for East Germany
Olympic silver medalists in athletics (track and field)
Goodwill Games medalists in athletics
Recipients of the Patriotic Order of Merit in silver
Competitors at the 1986 Goodwill Games